The American Association of Mobile Veterinary Practitioners (AAMVP) is a non-profit organization in the United States founded in 2010 to help support mobile veterinary practitioners across the nation. It is a national organization which also was international membership.  AAMVP offers a national forum to support mobile veterinary practitioners, veterinary students, and the vendors who provide products and services for quality veterinary medicine. AAMVP strives to be a leading resource and offer a robust support community for sharing information, ideas, and encouragement relevant to the mobile veterinary industry.

Dena D. Baker, DVM is the current Founding Director of the American Association of Veterinary Practitioners, and as a founding director has held that position since the organization's inception.

In 2012, The American Association of Housecall Veterinarians (AAHV) merged into the AAMVP.

Their domain, www.aamvp.org, and was last cached as the AAMVP website in August 2015 and has been up for sale since. As of October 2022, it is still for sale.

References

Veterinary medicine-related professional associations
Veterinary medicine in the United States
Professional associations based in the United States